AFRU may refer to:

 Asian Rugby Football Union, now Asia Rugby
 No. 7 Service Flying Training School RAAF, later called the Advanced Flying and Refresher Unit
 Africa Renewal University